Namin may refer to:

Namin County in Iran
Namin, Ardabil the capital of Namin County 
Nam-e Nik, also known as Namin
Stas Namin (born 1951), Russian rock musician